Joost Maurits van Aken (born 13 May 1994) is a Dutch professional footballer who plays as a centre-back for Eredivisie club SC Heerenveen. He started his senior career at SC Heerenveen, and has also played for Sheffield Wednesday, VfL Osnabrück and Zulte Waregem. Internationally, he has played for the Netherlands under-21s.

Career

SC Heerenveen
Van Aken made his first appearance for SC Heerenveen on 16 February 2014 against the then champions AFC Ajax. Around two months later, van Aken scored his first goal for the club against Go Ahead Eagles. 

In June 2015, van Aken signed a new three year contract running until 2018. He went on to make 92 appearances for the club in all competitions, scoring three goals.

Sheffield Wednesday
On 30 August 2017, Sheffield Wednesday announced that they had signed van Aken from Eredevisie side SC Heerenveen for an undisclosed fee on a four year contract. He was assigned the number 4 shirt. van Aken made his Football League debut on 9 September, playing the entire ninety minutes in a 3–1 victory over Nottingham Forest.

On 14 August 2019, van Aken joined VfL Osnabrück on a loan deal until the end of 2019–20 season.

On 12th September 2020 Van Aken returned to the Sheffield Wednesday starting line up and had a very impressive game against Cardiff City FC. He was sent off at home to Luton Town resulting in defeat on 24 October 2020, ending a run of games since his return to the club. On 20 May 2021 it was announced that he would leave Sheffield Wednesday at the end of the season, following the expiry of his contract.

Zulte Waregem
On 15 May 2021, Zulte Waregem announced that van Aken had signed a 2 year deal with the Belgian club. He made his competitive debut on 24 July in the Jupiler Pro League against OH Leuven, getting sent off in a 1–1 draw. On 25 January 2022, he was released from his contract.

Return to Heerenveen
On 7 February 2022, van Aken returned to SC Heerenveen until the end of the 2021–22 season, signing as a free agent.

Career statistics

References

External links
 Voetbal International profile 
 
 Netherlands profile at OnsOranje

1994 births
Footballers from Haarlem
Living people
Dutch footballers
Netherlands under-21 international footballers
Association football defenders
SC Heerenveen players
Sheffield Wednesday F.C. players
VfL Osnabrück players
S.V. Zulte Waregem players
Eredivisie players
English Football League players
2. Bundesliga players
Belgian Pro League players
Dutch expatriate footballers
Expatriate footballers in England
Expatriate footballers in Germany
Expatriate footballers in Belgium
Dutch expatriate sportspeople in England
Dutch expatriate sportspeople in Germany
Dutch expatriate sportspeople in Belgium